Franz Mayer of Munich  is a German stained glass design and manufacturing company, based in Munich, Germany and a major exponent of the Munich style of stained glass, that has been active throughout most of the world for over 170 years. The firm was popular during the late nineteenth and early twentieth century, and was the principal provider of stained glass to the large Roman Catholic churches that were constructed throughout the world during that period. Franz Mayer of Munich were stained glass artists to the Holy See and consequently were popular with Roman Catholic clients. The family business is nowadays managed by the fifth generation and works in conjunction with renowned artists around the world.

History

Founder – Joseph Gabriel Mayer

In 1847, Joseph Gabriel Mayer (1808–1883) founded the “Institute for Christian Art“ in Munich, to make ecclesiastical furnishings. Royal commissions for the Cologne and Regensburg cathedrals drew Mayer to create a stained glass department in 1860. In 1865 a branch was opened in London, and in 1888 in New York City.

"Stylistically, Mayer's windows tend to contain richly colored scenes bordered by architectural frames consisting of pilasters, columns, architrave and elaborate canopies." It represents an aesthetic that was evidently prized in its time for its craftsmanship and opulence as well as for its ability to engage the viewer emotionally and spiritually.

Broadly speaking, the Munich Pictorial Style is Romantic and "owed much to the revival of religious painting – especially fresco painting in the tradition of the Italian Renaissance masters, especially Masaccio, Raphael, and Michelangelo – in Germany early in the 19th-century." "The studio often incorporated imagery from Great Master paintings as well as compositions of the nineteenth century, a standard practice in public decorative work of the era. For example, a window in the Cathedral of St. John the Baptist, Charleston, South Carolina, installed in 1907 or 1925–26, shows the Transfiguration of Christ modeled after the 1517 painting by Raphael in the Vatican."

2nd Generation
 Joseph Leonhard Mayer(1846–1898), sculptor and artistic director
 Franz Borghias Mayer(1848–1926), artist and councilor of commerce

In 1882 the company was awarded the status of “Royal Bavarian Art Establishment“ by King Ludwig the II. In 1892, Pope Leo XIII named the company a “Pontifical Institute of Christian Art“. "Munich glass windows could be imported as art, i.e., glass “paintings” and—exempt from a high tariff on imported “raw” glass ... the broad aesthetic appeal, economic advantage, and papal approval made Munich glass windows the overwhelming choice among Roman Catholics in the United States."

3rd Generation – between two wars
 Anton Mayer(1886–1967), academic painter
 Karl Mayer (1889–1971), poet and merchant
 Adalbert Mayer (1894–1987), businessman and strategist

In 1919 the company became a workshop for free artists such as Karl Knappe. In 1922 the neighboring properties on Seidlstraße 25/27 were purchased. The new building by the architect Theodor Fischer serves as today's company headquarters. In the years following 1933, the Mayer brothers successfully remain untangled with the affairs of the NSDAP. In 1939 the companies Mayer and Zettler combined, but production ground to a halt in 1941. In 1944 the staff had decreased from an original 500 to fewer than 20 employees.

Rapid renovations followed the war. Many of Munich's cathedral windows were restored by the company, such as the windows of the Munich Frauenkirche. In 1961, Karl Knappe designed a mosaic for the Assumption of Mary Cathedral, Hiroshima.

4th Generation – transition to international artist workshop
 Konrad Mayer(1923–2012), son of Karl Mayer
 Gabriel Mayer(born 1938), son of Adalbert Mayer

In 1953, Konrad Mayer took over the representation in South America. From 1970 on, Gabriel Mayer pushed architecture-related works and the Middle East market, resulting in the realization of the Heart Tent by Bettina and Frei Otto at the Diplomatic Club Riyadh, Saudi Arabia. In 1988 Gabriel Mayer founded a new workshop in New York with the focus on public art. From the 1990s many projects with artist Brian Clarke were realized, in Rio de Janeiro, New York and more.

In 2013 Gabriel Mayer pulled back from the company's management board. In 2016 he was awarded the Bavarian Culture Prize together with Charlotte Knobloch.

5th Generation – present
 Michael Claudius Mayer (born 1967), mosaicist and businessman
 Petra Wilma Mayer (born 1964), Architect (TUM)

Since 1994 the couple collaborated on Munich projects such as the Herz-Jesu-Kirche (1996), Fünf Höfe (2001) and Path of memory, Ohel Jakob synagogue (2005). Around the turn of the millennium, Gabriel and Michael Mayer revived the traditional stained-glass Munich/Mayer Style and thus the DNA of the house. The float glass department was newly constructed. In 2014 the company opened an office at New York City. In 2018 Petra Mayer founded the Chamber of Wonders, featuring editions and selected pieces from a selection of worldwide artist friends. In the same year, Franz Mayer of Munich realized a 400m2 mosaic for the New York City metro station World Trade Center station (PATH) with the artist Ann Hamilton.

Mayer's commissions include over seventy-six cathedrals, twenty-six of them in the United States.

Along with the stained glass, about half of the company's work is in mosaics. In the fifties and sixties, Mayer developed their own fibre-glass mesh. Adhesives have also been developed to the firm's own specifications. The company provides installation and curatorial services.

Nowadays the company fabricates and realizes mosaic and glass projects in collaboration with renowned artists, such as Georg Baselitz, Kiki Smith, Shahzia Sikander, Brian Clarke, Doug and Mike Starn, Ellsworth Kelly, Jani Leinonen, JR, William Wegman, Nick Cave, Sean Scully, Jan Hendrix, Peter Beard or Vik Muniz.

List of Works

Australia
 Church of St. John the Evangelist, Fremantle, Western Australia

Canada

 Cathedral of the Immaculate Conception, Saint John, New Brunswick
 St. Patrick's Church, Halifax, Nova Scotia
 Basilica of Our Lady Immaculate, Guelph, Ontario
 Cathedral of Christ the King, Hamilton, Ontario
 St. Mary's Cathedral, Kingston, Ontario
 Blessed Sacrament RC Church, Ottawa, Ontario
 St. Patrick's Basilica, Ottawa, Ontario
 Cathedral Church of St. James, Toronto, Ontario
 St. Michael's Church, Toronto, Ontario
 Church of St. Thomas Aquinas, Toronto, Ontario
 Basilica de Notre-Dame, Montreal, Quebec
 Cathedral-Basilica de Notre-Dame, Quebec City, Quebec

Chile
 Cathedral of Antofagasta, Antofagasta, Chile

England
 Church of St. Michael, Princetown, Devon
 St. Andrew's Church, Framingham Pigot, Norfolk
 St. John's Church, Acaster Selby, North Yorkshire
 All Saints' Church, Appleton Roebuck, North Yorkshire
 All Saints' Church, Rockwell Green, Somerset
 Pershore Abbey, Pershore, Worcestershire

France
 Holy Trinity Church, Nice, Alpes-Maritimes

New Zealand
 All Saints' Church, Dunedin, South Island

Northern Ireland
 St. Mark's Church, Belfast, County Antrim
 Christ Church Cathedral, Lisburn, County Antrim
 St. Patrick's Cathedral, Armagh, County Armagh
 Church of Christ the Redeemer, Lurgan, County Armagh
 St. Malachy's Church, Castlewellan, County Down
 St. Patrick's RC Church, Downpatrick, County Down
 St. John's Church, Hilltown, County Down
 Newry Cathedral, Newry, County Down
 St. Michael's Church, Enniskillen, County Fermanagh
 St Columb's Cathedral, Derry, County Londonderry
 St Eugene's Cathedral, Derry, County Londonderry
 Church of the Assumption, Magherafelt, County Londonderry
 Church of the Sacred Heart, Omagh, County Tyrone
 Loreto Church, Omagh, County Tyrone

Pakistan
 St. Patrick's Cathedral, Karachi, Sindh

Republic of Ireland

 Cathedral of the Assumption, Carlow, County Carlow
 St. Fethlimidh's Cathedral, Kilmore, County Cavan
 Church of the Immaculate Conception, Clonakilty, County Cork
 Cloyne Cathedral, Cloyne, County Cork
 St Colman's Cathedral, Cobh, County Cork
 Presentation Brothers' Novitiate, Cork, County Cork
 Vincentians, Sunday's Well, County Cork
 St. Patrick's Church, Killygordan, County Donegal
 Cathedral of St Eunan and St Columba, Letterkenny, County Donegal
 Our Lady of Dolours RC Church, Dolphin's Barn, County Dublin
 Church of the Sacred Heart, Donnybrook, County Dublin
 St. Ann's Church, Dublin, County Dublin
 St. Patrick's Church, Monkstown, County Dublin
 St. Peter's Church, Phibsborough, County Dublin
 St. Teresa's Church, Ardrahan, County Galway
 St. Mary's Church, Athenry, County Galway
 St. Mary's Church, Galway, County Galway
 Mausoleum Monivea, Monivea, County Galway
 Presentation Convent, Tralee, County Kerry
 St. Patrick's College, Maynooth, County Kildare
 Church of Saint Peter and Saint Paul, Monasterevin, County Kildare
 RC Church of Our Lady and St. David, Naas, County Kildare 
 St. Conleth's Church, Newbridge, County Kildare
 St Canice's Cathedral, Kilkenny, County Kilkenny
 St. Michael's Church, Portarlington, County Laois
 St. Nicholas' Church, Adare, County Limerick
 RC Church of Our Lady of the Immaculate Conception, Ballingarry, County Limerick
 Church of Saint Patrick and Saint Brigid, Kilmallock, County Limerick
 RC Church of Our Lady of Lourdes, Limerick, County Limerick
 St. Brigid's Church, Ardagh, County Longford
 St. Matthew's Church, Ballymahon, County Longford
 Church of Our Lady of the Immaculate Conception, Castlebellingham, County Louth
 Church of Mary Immaculate, Collon, County Louth
 St. Mary's Church, Drogheda, County Louth
 St. Peter's Church, Drogheda, County Louth
 Dominican Church, Dundalk, County Louth
 St. Nicholas' RC Church, Dundalk, County Louth
 Church of the Immaculate Conception, Termonfeckin, County Louth 
 St Muredach's Cathedral, Ballina, County Mayo
 Church of the Holy Rosary, Castlebar, County Mayo
 St. Mary's Church, Navan, County Meath
 St. Patrick's Church, Trim, County Meath
 St. Patrick's Church, Ballybay, County Monaghan
 St. Mary's Church, Castleblayney, County Monaghan
 Sacred Heart Catholic Church, Clones, County Monaghan
 Monaghan Cathedral, Monaghan, County Monaghan
 St. Brigid's Church, Clara, County Offaly
 Cathedral of St Nathy, Ballaghaderreen, County Roscommon
 RC Church of Our Lady of the Assumption, Collooney, County Sligo
 St. John's Church, Sligo, County Sligo
 St. Nicholas' Church, Carrick-on-Suir, County Tipperary
 St. Ailbe's Church, Emly, County Tipperary
 Church of St. Mary of the Rosary, Nenagh, County Tipperary
 St. Cronan's Church, Roscrea, County Tipperary
 Church of the Sacred Heart, Templemore, County Tipperary
 Cathedral of the Assumption, Thurles, County Tipperary
 St. Michael's Church, Tipperary, County Tipperary
 RC Church of the Holy Cross, Tramore, County Waterford
 Cathedral of the Most Holy Trinity, Waterford, County Waterford
 St. Mary's Church, Athlone, County Westmeath
 St. Aidan's Cathedral, Enniscorthy, County Wexford
 RC Church of St. Mary and St. Michael, New Ross, County Wexford
 Church of the Immaculate Conception, Wexford, County Wexford
 St. Joseph's Church, Baltinglass, County Wicklow
 Church of St. Mary and St. Michael, Rathdrum, County Wicklow

Scotland
 St. Mary's RC Church, Fochabers, Moray

United States

 Cathedral Church of the Advent, Birmingham, Alabama
 St. Elizabeth's Church, Greenville, Alabama
 [Cathedral Basilica of the Immaculate Conception, Mobile|Cathedral Basilica of the Immaculate Conception]], Mobile, Alabama
 Basilica San Francisco de Asis, San Francisco, California
 Chapel on the Rock, Allenspark, Colorado
 Basilica of the Immaculate Conception, Jacksonville, Florida
 St. Edward's RC Church, Palm Beach, Florida
 St. Paul's RC Church, Pensacola, Florida
 Basilica of the Sacred Heart of Jesus, Atlanta, Georgia
 First United Methodist Church, Atlanta, Georgia
 Church of the Most Holy Trinity, Augusta, Georgia
 Mulberry Street United Methodist Church, Macon, Georgia
 St. Joseph's RC Church, Macon, Georgia
 Christ Church, St. Simons, Georgia
 St. Hyacinth's Basilica, Avondale, Illinois
 St. Alphonsus' Church, Chicago, Illinois
 St. Gertrude's Church, Chicago, Illinois
 St. Michael's Church, Old Town, Illinois
 Cathedral of the Epiphany, Sioux City, Iowa
 Cathedral Basilica of the Assumption, Covington, Kentucky
 Mother of God RC Church, Covington, Kentucky
 St. Catherine of Sienna's Church, Metairie, Louisiana
 St. Joseph's RC Church, Biddeford, Maine
 Shrine of the Sacred Heart Church, Baltimore, Maryland
 St. James' Church, Haverhill, Massachusetts
 St. Joseph's RC Church, Stockbridge, Massachusetts
 St. Mary's Church, Uxbridge, Massachusetts
 Cathedral of Saint Andrew, Grand Rapids, Michigan
 Sisters of the Sacred Heart of Mary Church, Monroe, Michigan
 Cathedral of the Nativity of the Blessed Virgin Mary, Biloxi, Mississippi
 St. Thomas Aquinas' Church, Lincoln, Nebraska
 St. Frances Cabrini's RC Church, Omaha, Nebraska
 St. Stephen the Martyr's RC Church, Omaha, Nebraska
 Immaculate Conception Church, Montclair, New Jersey
 St. Mary's Church, Newark, New Jersey
 Cathedral Basilica of St. James, Brooklyn, New York State
 Corpus Christi RC Church, Buffalo, New York State
 St. Adalbert's Basilica, Buffalo, New York State
 St. Stanislaus' Church, Buffalo, New York State
 St. Matthew's Church, East Syracuse, New York State
 St. John's Evangelical Lutheran Church, Manhattan, New York State
 Church of Saint Peter, Saratoga Springs, New York State
 St. Ann's RC Church, Staten Island, New York State
 The Episcopal Church of the Holy Innocents, Henderson, North Carolina
 St. Joseph's RC Church, Circleville, Ohio
 St. Stephen's Church, Johnstown, Pennsylvania
 Our Lady Help of Christians Church, Philadelphia, Pennsylvania
 St. Leo the Great's RC Church, Philadelphia, Pennsylvania
 St. Mary's Church, Bristol, Rhode Island
 St. Mary's Church, Newport, Rhode Island
 St. Mary Help of Christians Church, Aiken, South Carolina
 Cathedral of St. John the Baptist, Charleston, South Carolina
 St. Mary's RC Church, Charleston, South Carolina
 St. Matthew's German Evangelical Lutheran Church, Charleston, South Carolina
 St. Timothy's Episcopal Church, Columbia, South Carolina
 Christ Church, Greenville, South Carolina
 St. James' Episcopal Church, Greenville, South Carolina
 St. Mary's RC Church, Greenville, South Carlina
 Dominican Sisters of St. Cecilia, Nashville, Tennessee
 St. Joseph's RC Church, Houston, Texas
 Christ and St. Luke's Church, Norfolk, Virginia
 Sacred Heart Church, Norfolk, Virginia
 St. Joseph's Villa, Richmond, Virginia
 Dahlgren Chapel of the Sacred Heart, Washington, D.C.
 Trinity Episcopal Church, Seattle, Washington State
 St. Mary Star of the Sea, Brooklyn, New York State

See also
 Franz Xaver Zettler, glass painter and Mayer's son-in-law

References

External links

 

Glassmaking companies of Germany
Manufacturing companies based in Munich
German stained glass artists and manufacturers
Bavarian Royal Warrant holders